The 2017 African Badminton Championships or All Africa Championships were held in Benoni, South Africa between 16–23 April, organised by the Badminton Confederation of Africa. At the team event, Egypt won the gold medal after beat South Africa with the score 3-1. Nigeria and Zambia settle for the bronze medal after reach the semi final round.

Medalists

Medal table

Results

Men's singles

Finals

Women's singles

Finals

Men's doubles

Finals

Women's doubles

Finals

Mixed doubles

Finals

References

External links 
 Individual Result
 Team Result

African Badminton Championships
2017 in African sport
Badminton in South Africa
African Badminton Championships
Badminton tournaments in South Africa